Garth David Everett (January 28, 1954 – January 28, 2023) was an American attorney and politician who served as a member of the Pennsylvania House of Representatives for the 84th district from 2007 to 2020.

Early life and education 
Everett attended Pennsylvania State University on an Air Force Reserve Officer Training Corps and graduated in 1976 with a degree in business management. Everett earned a Juris Doctor from Penn State Dickinson Law in 2000.

Career 
Everett served as a navigator on KC-135 refueling aircraft in the United States Air Force over 20 years before retiring in 1997 as a lieutenant colonel. After graduating from law school, he joined a law firm in Muncy Township working as a solicitor for several municipalities in Lycoming County.

Death
Everett died in Williamsport, Pennsylvania, on January 28, 2023; it was his 69th birthday.

References

External links
Pennsylvania House of Representatives - Garth Everett
Pennsylvania House Republican Caucus - Representative Garth Everett

1954 births
2023 deaths
Dickinson School of Law alumni
Republican Party members of the Pennsylvania House of Representatives
Smeal College of Business alumni
People from Lycoming County, Pennsylvania
United States Air Force officers
21st-century American politicians
Military personnel from Pennsylvania
Deaths from cancer in Pennsylvania